Irlen syndrome, also referred to as scotopic sensitivity syndrome (SSS), visual stress, or Meares–Irlen syndrome, is a light-based visual processing problem. Many mainstream professionals are skeptical of the concept; however, current neuroscience research has successfully documented differences in brain function among this population versus those without the condition. Early research on Irlen syndrome produced mixed results; however, the overwhelming majority of studies conducted over the last 40 years have documented the benefits of using precision-tinted colored lenses to address a variety of related symptomology, including: reduction in physical symptoms that include headaches, migraines, eye strain, fatigue, and light sensitivity; and improved functioning and success in both academia and the workplace.

History
In 1980, New Zealand teacher Olive Meares described the visual distortions some individuals reported when reading from white paper. In 1983, while working under a federal research grant at the California State University of Long Beach, American psychologist, Helen Irlen, discovered that filtering the visual information before reaching the brain through the use of either colored overlays or spectral filters (worn as glasses), could allow the brain to correctly process the visual information it received. In doing so, these colored overlays and spectral filters could eliminate symptoms associated with Irlen Syndrome. Similar symptoms were separately described by Meares and Irlen, each unaware of the other's work. Irlen, who was the first to systematically define the condition, named the condition "scotopic sensitivity syndrome," though in years following, some referred to it as Meares-Irlen syndrome, Irlen Syndrome, and visual stress.

Colored overlays and/or colored filters are recognized as a standard accommodation for standardized testing in many states in America, including California, Arkansas, Florida, Oklahoma, Nevada, Massachusetts, New Mexico, and Washington. The SAT, LSAT, ACT, Learning Ally, Illinois Department of Rehabilitation, Indiana Office of Vocational Rehabilitation, Michigan Rehabilitation Services, Texas Commission for the Blind, Nevada Vocational Rehabilitation Services, and Wisconsin Vocational Rehabilitation all officially recognize Irlen Syndrome. In Australia, the following are a sampling of agencies which have officially recognized Irlen Syndrome: Department of Employment, Education & Training, Departments of Army, Navy, and Air Force, Board of Studies – NSW, Board of Secondary Education – WA, Department of Children’s Services – WA, Commonwealth Employment Service (CES), Department of Rehabilitation, Geelong Medical Fund, and Technical and Further Education (TAFE).

Basic testing for Irlen Syndrome was tried by optometrists, opticians and orthoptists in UK hospitals, and by optometrists and opticians in private practice employing a technique that used the Intuitive Colorimeter, developed under Medical Research Council license. An alternative approach to correct Irlen syndrome was tried by Orthoscopics franchise in the UK, with wide color coverage and tints manufactured by Hoyato match. Other commercial organizations have produced sets of therapeutic tints, although most have not received scientific evaluation.

Early studies investigating Irlen' Syndrome as a treatable condition have been criticized for having a biased and subjective approach to their research; however, the most current research on Irlen Syndrome has established a hereditary component of the disorder, a number of biochemical markers for problems associated with Irlen Syndrome, and differences in brain function for individuals with Irlen Syndrome.

Classifications 
Irlen divides Irlen syndromes into six types: photophobia, distortion of the fundus, graphical distortions during reading, decreased visual field, difficulty in ocular fixation during reading and change in depth perception.

Research
There is currently a body of research related to Irlen Syndrome, Colored Overlays and Colored Filters that spans nearly 40 years. The Irlen Method and the efficacy of colored overlays and colored lenses has been the subject of over 200 research studies encompassing the disciplines of education, psychology, and medicine. To date, more than 100 of these studies supporting the use of colored overlays and lenses to treat the perceptual processing difficulties associated with Irlen Syndrome are published in peer-reviewed academic and scientific journals, including the Journal of Learning Disabilities, Australian Journal of Special Education, Perceptual and Motor Skills, Australian Journal of Learning Disabilities, Journal of Clinical & Experimental Neuropsychology, Journal of Research in Reading, Behavioral Optometry, and Ophthalmological and Behavioral Optics, among others.

The condition has been studied in several institutions around the world, including Cornell University, University of Pittsburgh in the United States, the Psychology Department at Essex University,  and the former Applied Psychology Unit, Cambridge University in England, David Yellen Academic College in Israel, the University of Tsukuba and Chiba University in Japan, Universidade Federal de Minas Gerais and Faculdades Integradeas Pitagoras de Montes Claros in Brazil, and Glasgow Caledonian University in Scotland.

In Australia, Irlen syndrome was researched by Paul Whiting at the University of Sydney. Whiting set up the first Irlen Dyslexia Centre in Australia, which operated in the Children's Centre at Sydney University for more than 15 years. Irlen syndrome was also studied in Australia by Greg Robinson (1944–2008) at the University of Newcastle. He was director of the Special Education Centre at the School of Education.

While the occasional study has suggested there is inconclusive evidence for the efficacy of colored lenses specifically to address reading performance deficits, the broader literature base encompassing the efficacy of the treatment to address physical symptoms, migraines, attention challenges, depth perception, ocular movement, and light sensitivity, among a variety of populations, including those with autism, ADHD, brain injury, stroke, learning disabilities, and the general population, provides a strong foundation for future research on the topic.

Treatment

The College of Optometrists (UK) has specified guidelines for optometrists who use the colorimeter system. This system differs from the system of colour selection developed by Helen Irlen, and prescribed tints will vary from those obtained via other methods. A society for coloured lens prescribers has been established to provide a list of eye-care practitioners with expertise in the provision of coloured lenses for the treatment of visual stress.

Irlen Method
The Irlen Method uses colored overlays and individualized, precision tinted lenses in the form of glasses or contact lenses. The method is intended to correct visual processing problems; it is claimed the resultant retiming of visual signals in the brain improves symptoms associated with Irlen Syndrome.

See also

References

Further reading

 

Vision
Dyslexia
Syndromes
Alternative diagnoses
Alternative therapies for developmental and learning disabilities